Nah-Shon Burrell (born February 5, 1990) is an American professional mixed martial artist currently competing in the Middleweight division. A professional competitor since 2010, Burrell has competed for Bellator MMA, the Ultimate Fighting Championship (UFC), Strikeforce, Absolute Championship Berkut and the Cage Fury Fighting Championships.

Background
Burrell is from the Overbrook neighborhood of Philadelphia, Pennsylvania, and attended Overbrook High School where he competed in football as well as track and field, and was talented. Burrell often got into fights and ultimately did not stick with sports as he admits that "did not like taking orders". However, after Burrell began watching UFC fights, he became motivated to become a mixed martial arts fighter himself.

Mixed martial arts career

Early career
After a 3–2 amateur career, Burrell began his professional MMA career in 2010. He fought only for middle Atlantic states organizations. With a MMA record of 5–1, he signed with Strikeforce.

Strikeforce
Burrell made his debut on May 20, 2011, at Strikeforce: Overeem vs. Werdum against Joe Ray. He won via unanimous decision.

Burrell faced Lukasz Les on August 12, 2011, at Strikeforce Challengers: Gurgel vs. Duarte. He won via TKO in the second round.

Burrell faced James Terry on January 7, 2012, at Strikeforce: Rockhold vs. Jardine. He won via split decision.

Burrell was expected to face Bobby Voelker on May 19, 2012, at Strikeforce: Barnett vs. Cormier, however Voelker had to withdraw due to injury and was replaced by Chris Spang. He lost via TKO in the first round.

Burrell was expected to face Yuri Villefort on September 29, 2012, at Strikeforce: Melendez vs. Healy. However, the event was cancelled due to headliner and lightweight champion Gilbert Melendez getting injured.

Ultimate Fighting Championship
Burrell made his promotional debut against fellow Strikeforce import Yuri Villefort on February 23, 2013, at UFC 157. He won the back-and-forth fight via unanimous decision (30-27, 29-28, 29-28).

Burrell faced Stephen Thompson on May 25, 2013, at UFC 160. He lost the fight by unanimous decision (29-28, 30-27, 29-28) and was subsequently released from the promotion.

Bellator MMA
Burrell was expected to make his promotional debut against Dante Rivera on November 15, 2013, at Bellator 108. However, Rivera was removed from the card due to undisclosed reasons and Burrell instead faced Jesus Martinez. He won the fight via unanimous decision (30-27, 30-27, 29-28).

Burrell faced Andrey Koreshkov in the quarterfinal match of Bellator Season Ten Welterweight Tournament on March 14, 2014, at Bellator 112. He was defeated early in the first round via TKO at 0:41.

Burrell faced Michael Page at Bellator 128 on October 10, 2014, and lost the bout via unanimous decision (30-27, 30-27, 30-27).

Absolute Championship Berkut
Burrell was scheduled to make his promotional debut at ACB 72. However, the bout was rescheduled to ACB 75 on November 25, 2017, due to unknown reasons. In turn, Isaev's entry to Germany was denied and the bout was cancelled. Eventually, Burrell faced Beslan Isaev on December 23, 2017, at ACB 77. He lost the fight by majority decision.

Burrell faced Albert Tumenov on December 23, 2017, at ACB 80. He lost the fight by unanimous decision.

In his third fight in ACB, Burrell headlined ACB 84 against Arbi Agujev on April 7, 2018. He lost the fight via unanimous decision.

Return to regional circuit
After the three-fight stint in ACB, Burrell faced Ron Stallings at CES MMA 52 on August 17, 2018. He lost the fight via unanimous decision.

Burrell was expected to face Gabriel Checco at Final Fight Championship 38 on June 20, 2019. However, the bout was cancelled due to unknown reasons.

Burrell was then scheduled to face Danny Davis Jr. at CFFC 85 on September 18, 2020. However, the bout was scrapped due to unknown reasons and Burrell faced Ryot Waller at CFFC 84 on September 17, 2020. He won the fight via second-round submission.

Burrell next faced Moses Murrietta at CFFC 90 on December 17, 2020. He won the fight via first-round knockout.

Burrell faced Khetag Pliev at CFFC 99 on August 14, 2021. He won the fight via third-round knockout.

Burrell faced Kyle Stewart at CFFC 102 on October 30, 2021. He won the fight via unanimous decision.

Burrell faced Ikram Aliskerov at Eagle FC 46 on March 11, 2022. At weigh ins, Aliskerov missed weight for his bout. Aliskerov weighed in at 186.2 pounds, 0.2 pounds over the middleweight non-title limit. The bout proceeded at catchweight and he was fined a percentage of his purse, which went to Burrell. He lost the bout via unanimous decision.

Mixed martial arts record

|-
|Loss
|align=center|19–12 (1)
| Ikram Aliskerov
| Decision (unanimous)
| Eagle FC 46
| 
| align=center|3
| align=center|5:00
| Miami, Florida, United States
|
|-
|Win
|align=center|19–11 (1)
|Kyle Stewart
|Decision (unanimous)
|CFFC 102
|
|align=center|3
|align=center|5:00
|Philadelphia, Pennsylvania, United States
|
|-
|Win
|align=center|18–11 (1)
|Khetag Pliev
|KO (punch)
|CFFC 99
|
|align=center|3
|align=center|1:56
|Tunica, Mississippi, United States
|
|-
|Win
|align=center|17–11 (1)
|Moses Murrietta
|KO (punches)
|CFFC 90
|
|align=center|1
|align=center|3:00
|Lancaster, Pennsylvania, United States
|
|-
|Win
|align=center|16–11 (1)
|Ryot Waller
|Submission (rear-naked choke)
|CFFC 84
|
|align=center| 2
|align=center| 2:00
|Tunica, Mississippi, United States
|
|-
|Loss
|align=center|15–11 (1)
|Ron Stallings
|Decision (unanimous)
|CES MMA 52
|
|align=center| 3
|align=center| 5:00
|Lincoln, Rhode Island, United States
|
|-
|Loss
|align=center|15–10 (1)
|Arbi Agujev
|Decision (unanimous)
|ACB 84: Agujev vs. Burrell
|
|align=center| 3
|align=center| 5:00
|Bratislava, Slovakia
|
|-
|Loss
|align=center|15–9 (1)
|Albert Tumenov
|Decision (unanimous)
|ACB 80: Tumenov vs. Burrell
|
|align=center| 3
|align=center| 5:00
|Krasnodar, Russia
|
|-
|Loss
|align=center|15–8 (1)
|Beslan Isaev
|Decision (majority)
|ACB 77: Abdulvakhabov vs. Vartanyan 2 
|
|align=center| 3
|align=center| 5:00
|Moscow, Russia
|
|-
|Win
| align=center| 15–7 (1)
|Micah Terrill
|TKO (punches)
|XCC 28: Xtreme Caged Combat 28
| 
| align=center| 1
| align=center| 1:16
| Philadelphia, Pennsylvania, United States
|Return to Welterweight.
|-
| Loss
| align=center| 14–7 (1)
| Tim Williams
| Decision (unanimous)
| Cage Fury Fighting Championships 59
| 
| align=center| 3
| align=center| 5:00
| Philadelphia, Pennsylvania, United States
| 
|-
| Win
| align=center| 14–6 (1)
| Dustin Long	
| TKO (punches)
| Global Proving Ground 24
| 
| align=center| 1
| align=center| 4:40
| Voorhees, New Jersey, United States
|Won vacant Global Proving Ground Middleweight Championship.
|-
| Win
| align=center| 13–6 (1)
| Chris Curtis
| Decision (split)
| CES 34: Curtis vs. Burrell 
| 
| align=center| 5
| align=center| 5:00
| Mashantucket, Connecticut, United States
| 
|-
| Win
| align=center| 12–6 (1)
| Ryan Dickson
| TKO (punches)
| Global Proving Ground 22
| 
| align=center| 2
| align=center| 0:29
| Voorhees, New Jersey, United States
| 
|-
| Loss
| align=center| 11–6 (1)
| Lyman Good
| Submission (rear-naked choke)
| Cage Fury Fighting Championships 48
| 
| align=center| 1
| align=center| 3:47
| Atlantic City, New Jersey, United States
| 
|-
| Win
| align=center| 11–5 (1)
| Ryan Hodge
| TKO (punches)
| New England Fights: Fight Night 16
| 
| align=center| 1
| align=center| 3:16
| Lewiston, Maine, United States
| 
|-
| Loss
| align=center| 10–5 (1)
| Michael Page
| Decision (unanimous)
| Bellator 128
| 
| align=center| 3
| align=center| 5:00
| Thackerville, Oklahoma, United States
| 
|-
| Loss
| align=center| 10–4 (1)
| Andrey Koreshkov
| TKO (knee and punches)
| Bellator 112
| 
| align=center| 1
| align=center| 0:41
| Hammond, Indiana, United States
| 
|-
| Win
| align=center| 10–3 (1)
| Jesus Martinez
| Decision (unanimous)
| Bellator 108
| 
| align=center| 3
| align=center| 5:00
| Atlantic City, New Jersey, United States
| 
|-
| NC
| align=center| 9–3 (1)
| Mike Wade
| No Contest
| Richmond Rumble MMA
| 
| align=center| 3
| align=center| 5:00
| Richmond, Virginia, United States
| 
|-
| Loss
| align=center| 9–3
| Stephen Thompson
| Decision (unanimous)
| UFC 160
| 
| align=center| 3
| align=center| 5:00
| Las Vegas, Nevada, United States
| 
|-
| Win
| align=center| 9–2
| Yuri Villefort
| Decision (unanimous)
| UFC 157
| 
| align=center| 3
| align=center| 5:00
| Anaheim, California, United States
| 
|-
| Loss
| align=center| 8–2
| Chris Spang
| TKO (knee and punches)
| Strikeforce: Barnett vs. Cormier
| 
| align=center| 1
| align=center| 3:25
| San Jose, California, United States
| 
|-
| Win
| align=center| 8–1
| James Terry
| Decision (split)
| Strikeforce: Rockhold vs. Jardine
| 
| align=center| 3
| align=center| 5:00
| Las Vegas, Nevada, United States
| 
|-
| Win
| align=center| 7–1
| Lukasz Les
| TKO (leg kick and punches)
| Strikeforce Challengers: Gurgel vs. Duarte
| 
| align=center| 2
| align=center| 2:09
| Las Vegas, Nevada, United States
| 
|-
| Win
| align=center| 6–1
| Joe Ray
| Decision (unanimous)
| Strikeforce: Overeem vs. Werdum
| 
| align=center| 3
| align=center| 5:00
| Dallas, Texas, United States
| 
|-
| Win
| align=center| 5–1
| Daryl Harris
| KO (knee)
| Cage Fury Fighting Championships 8
| 
| align=center| 2
| align=center| 1:32
| Atlantic City, New Jersey, United States
| 
|-
| Win
| align=center| 4–1
| Craig Thieme
| TKO (punches)
| Cage Fury Fighting Championships 6
| 
| align=center| 3
| align=center| 3:34
| Atlantic City, New Jersey, United States
| 
|-
| Win
| align=center| 3–1
| Robert Corpora
| TKO (punches)
| Asylum Fight League 32
| 
| align=center| 2
| align=center| 3:34
| Philadelphia, Pennsylvania, United States
| 
|-
| Loss
| align=center| 2–1
| Chris Curtis
| Decision (unanimous)
| Xtreme Caged Combat: Hostile Intent
| 
| align=center| 3
| align=center| 5:00
| Feasterville-Trevose, Pennsylvania, United States
| 
|-
| Win
| align=center| 2–0
| Juan Garcia
| TKO (punches)
| Xtreme Caged Combat: Onslaught
| 
| align=center| 1
| align=center| 4:24
| Feasterville-Trevose, Pennsylvania, United States
| 
|-
| Win
| align=center| 1–0
| Brad Pole
| TKO (punches)
| Jake the Snake Promotions: Cage Time 2
| 
| align=center| 1
| align=center| 3:28
| Ocean City, Maryland, United States
|

See also
 List of Bellator MMA alumni

References

External links
 
 

1990 births
Living people
American male mixed martial artists
Welterweight mixed martial artists
Mixed martial artists from Pennsylvania
Sportspeople from Philadelphia
Middleweight mixed martial artists
Mixed martial artists utilizing Brazilian jiu-jitsu
Ultimate Fighting Championship male fighters
American practitioners of Brazilian jiu-jitsu